The Atwima-Nwabiagya North is one of the constituencies represented in the Parliament of Ghana. It elects one Member of Parliament (MP) by the first past the post system of election. Atwima-Nwabiagya North is located in the Atwima Nwabiagya District  of the Ashanti Region of Ghana. The constituency and Atwima-Nwabiagya South are sister constituencies born out of the Atwima-Nwabiagya constituency in 2012.

Boundaries
The seat is located within the Atwima District of the Ashanti Region of Ghana.

See also
List of Ghana Parliament constituencies

References 

Parliamentary constituencies in the Ashanti Region
Ashanti Region